V Sport Extra is a television channel owned by Viaplay Group broadcasting to Sweden. It specializes in HD sports. The channel started broadcasting on 8 April 2016. The channel is sometimes broadcast as TV3 Sport without HD.
In 1 June 2020 TV3 Sport HD was rebranded to V Sport Extra.

References

Nordic Entertainment Group
Television channels in Sweden
Television channels and stations established in 2016
2016 establishments in Sweden